Teverola is a comune (municipality) in the Province of Caserta in the Italian region Campania, located about  north of Naples and about  southwest of Caserta.

Teverola borders the following municipalities: Aversa, Carinaro, Casaluce, Santa Maria Capua Vetere.

References

Cities and towns in Campania